The Uruguayan Championship of the Uruguayan Football Federation was a football tournament held in Uruguay between 1923 and 1925, during the schism of Uruguayan football.

It was organized by the Uruguayan Football Federation ("Federación Uruguaya de Fútbol" – FUF), entity dissident of the Uruguayan Football Association (AUF), founded after the resignation of AUF of Peñarol and Central occurred during the 1922 Uruguayan championship.

Only two tournaments (1923 and 1924) came to complete, since in 1925 the Uruguayan government intervention to achieve unification interrupted football championship that year.

List of champions 
Uruguayan Football Federation tournaments are not recognized by the Uruguayan Football Association.

Primera División

Titles by club

See also 
 Uruguayan Football Federation
 Uruguayan Primera División (AUF)

References 

1923 establishments in Uruguay
Recurring sporting events established in 1923